Kim Barker is a journalist who authored The Taliban Shuffle: Strange Days in Afghanistan and Pakistan about her experiences covering the war in Afghanistan. The book was adapted into the 2016 film Whiskey Tango Foxtrot and Barker was portrayed by Tina Fey.

Barker was the South Asia bureau chief for the Chicago Tribune. She was based out of New Delhi and Islamabad. She also covered the tsunami in Asia and an earthquake in Kashmir.

After writing the book she got a job with ProPublica covering campaign finance.

In the wake of Lara Logan's account of sexual assault, Barker wrote about harassment issues she faced being a female correspondent.

She is currently a reporter for The New York Times.
As of February 2023 she has a podcast about a cold case from her hometown, Laramie, WY.

References

Year of birth missing (living people)
Living people
American expatriates in Pakistan
American women journalists
Chicago Tribune people